HMS Endeavour was a 14-gun fore-and-aft rigged schooner of the Royal Navy, purchased from private owners in 1782 to assist in the British military effort during the American Revolutionary War.

She was fitted after her purchase with 14 four-pounder guns.

Her purchase cost is unrecorded.

References

Bibliography
 

Schooners of the Royal Navy
1780s ships